The cotingas are a large family, Cotingidae, of suboscine passerine birds found in Central America and tropical South America. Cotingas are birds of forests or forest edges, that are primary frugivorous. They all have broad bills with hooked tips, rounded wings, and strong legs.

Description
Cotingas vary widely in social structure. There is a roughly 50/50 divide in the family between species with biparental care, and those in which the males play no part in raising the young. The purple-throated fruitcrow lives in mixed-sex groups in which one female lays an egg and the others help provide insects to the chick.

In cotinga species where only the females care for the eggs and young, the males have striking courtship displays, often grouped together in leks. Such sexual selection results in the males of these species, including the Guianan cock-of-the-rock, being brightly coloured, or decorated with plumes or wattles, like the umbrellabirds, with their umbrella-like crest and long throat wattles. Other lekking cotingids like the bellbirds and screaming piha, have distinctive and far-carrying calls. In such canopy-dwelling genera as Carpodectes, Cotinga, and Xipholena, males gather high in a single tree or in adjacent trees, but male cocks-of-the-rock, as befits their more terrestrial lives, give their elaborate displays in leks on the ground.

The females of both lekking and biparental species are duller than the males.

Breeding
Nests range from tiny to very large. Many species lay a single egg in a nest so flimsy that the egg can be seen from underneath. This may make the nests hard for predators to find. Fruiteaters build more solid cup nests, and the cocks-of-the-rock attach their mud nests to cliffs. The nests may be open cups or little platforms with loosely woven plant material, usually placed in a tree.
The clutches comprise one to four eggs. Incubation typically takes 15-28 days. 
Fledging usually occurs at 28–33 days.

Habitat
Deserts, open woodlands, coastal mangroves, and humid tropical forests comprise their habitats. Cotingas face very serious threats from the loss of their habitats.

Taxonomy and systematics
The family Cotingidae was introduced by French naturalist Charles Lucien Bonaparte in 1849. According to the International Ornithological Committee, as of July 2021, the family contains 66 species divided into 24 genera.

A 2014 molecular phylogenetic study of the cotingas by Jacob Berv and Richard Prum found that the genera formed five monophyletic clades and they proposed that the family could be divided into five subfamilies.

In the above cladogram, the genus Tijuca is not shown, as it was embedded in Lipaugus, a position that was confirmed by a more detailed 2020 study. The genus Perissocephalus is also not shown as it was embedded in Cephalopterus.

A number of species previously placed in this family are now placed in the family Tityridae (genera Laniisoma, Laniocera and Iodopleura)

References

Further reading
 Snow, D.W. (1976). "The relationship between climate and annual cycles in the Cotingidae." Ibis 118(3):366-401
 Snow, D.W. (1982). The Cotingas: Bellbirds, Umbrella birds and their allies. British Museum Press.

External links

Cotinga videos on the Internet Bird Collection

Higher-level bird taxa restricted to the Neotropics
Taxa named by Charles Lucien Bonaparte